Germano Boettcher Sobrinho (14 March 1911 – 9 June 1977), known as just Germano, was a Brazilian football player. He has played for the Brazil national team.

References

1911 births
1977 deaths
Footballers from Rio de Janeiro (city)
Brazilian footballers
Brazil international footballers
1934 FIFA World Cup players
Botafogo de Futebol e Regatas players
Association football goalkeepers